Gerardo Federico Magallanes González (born 28 August 1976) is an Uruguay retired footballer who played as a forward.

He played for several clubs throughout his career, including Defensor Sporting, Peñarol Montevideo, Atalanta B.C., Real Madrid CF, Racing de Santander, S.S.C. Venezia, Torino F.C., SD Eibar, Sevilla FC, Dijon FCO and closed his career at Mérida UD in March 2009.

After having been without contract for over a year, on 26 October 2008, Magallanes made his debut for Mérida UD, in the Spanish 2ª División B, where he has signed until end of the 2008–09 season.

At international level, he also has played for the Uruguay national football team on 26 occasions between 1995 and 2002, scoring 6 goals, and was a member of team that finished in second-place at the 1999 Copa América; he was also participant at the 2002 FIFA World Cup.

Honours

International

 Copa América: Runner-up 1999

References

1976 births
Living people
Uruguayan footballers
Footballers from Montevideo
Uruguayan Primera División players
Peñarol players
Defensor Sporting players
Ligue 2 players
Dijon FCO players
Atalanta B.C. players
Venezia F.C. players
Torino F.C. players
Serie A players
Expatriate footballers in Italy
Expatriate footballers in France
Expatriate footballers in Spain
La Liga players
Segunda División players
Real Madrid CF players
Racing de Santander players
SD Eibar footballers
Sevilla FC players
Uruguay international footballers
2002 FIFA World Cup players
1999 Copa América players
Uruguayan expatriate footballers
Uruguayan expatriate sportspeople in Spain
Uruguayan people of Spanish descent
Uruguayan expatriate sportspeople in Italy
Association football forwards